Clube Náutico Marcílio Dias, known simply as Marcílio Dias, is a Brazilian football club from Itajaí, Santa Catarina state. The club plays its home matches at Hercílio Luz and competed in Copa João Havelange in 2000, in the Campeonato Brasileiro Série B in 1989, in the Campeonato Brasileiro Série C in 1988, 1995, 2001, 2003, 2005 and 2006. The club won the Recopa Sul-Brasileira in 2007, the state championship in 1963, and the state cup in 2007.

History
The club was founded on March 17, 1919, by Alírio Gandra, Victor Miranda and Gabriel João Collares with the intention to develop rowing in Itajaí city. The club's name was given after a suggestion by its first president, Ignácio Mascarenhas.

In 1963, Marcílio Dias won its first title, which was the state championship.

In 1988, the club competed in the Campeonato Brasileiro Série C for the first time, being eliminated in the third stage of the competition. In the following year, Marcílio Dias competed in the Campeonato Brasileiro Série B, but was eliminated in the first stage of the competition.

In 1995, Marcílio Dias competed again in the Campeonato Brasileiro Série C, and also competed in its first international competition, which was the Torneio Mercosul, reaching the semifinal stage of the competition. In 1999, the club won the Campeonato Catarinense Second Level, after beating in the final a club from the same city, Itajaí.

The club competed in the yellow module of Copa João Havelange in 2000, but was eliminated in the competition's first stage, in 2001, in 2003, in 2005 and in 2006 Marcílio Dias competed in the Campeonato Brasileiro Série C, being eliminated in the first stage in those seasons. In 2007, Marcílio Dias won the Copa Santa Catarina, thus qualifying to the following year's Campeonato Brasileiro Série C and the same season's Recopa Sul-Brasileira. On December 8, 2007, the club beat Caxias 4-1, and won the Recopa Sul-Brasileira. Marcílio Dias' Luiz Ricardo, with five goals, was the competition's top goalscorer.

Titles
Recopa Sul-Brasileira: 1
2007

Campeonato Catarinense: 1
1963

Copa Santa Catarina: 2
2007, 2022

Campeonato Catarinense Série B: 3
1999, 2010, 2013

Stadium
Marcílio Dias's home stadium is Hercílio Luz, built in 1921, with a maximum capacity of 12,000 people.

Club name
The club is named after the guerrilheiro da marinha Marcílio Dias, who fought in the Paraguayan War and died in the Battle of Riachuelo.

Current squad

References

External links
 Marcílio Dias' official website

 
Association football clubs established in 1919
Football clubs in Santa Catarina (state)
1919 establishments in Brazil